Eutreta apicalis is a species of fruit fly in the family Tephritidae.

Distribution
Mexico, Nicaragua, Costa Rica.

References

Tephritinae
Insects described in 1904
Diptera of North America